The 1892 Kalamazoo football team was an American football team that represented Kalamazoo College in the 1892 college football season.  In their first season fielding a football team, the Kalamazoo eleven lost two games against Olivet College, being outscored 32 to 8 by their opponent.  The first game, played October 24 at Olivet, was planned as a part of Olivet's field day of 1892, which also included boxing matches, tennis, and track and field events like the hammer throw and pole vaulting.  During the contest, Kalamazoo took an early 4–0 lead, but allowed 20 answered points, 8 in the first half and 12 in the second.

Schedule

References

Kalamazoo
Kalamazoo Hornets football seasons
College football winless seasons
Kalamazoo football